Beaver was a sternwheel steamboat built in 1873 for the Willamette Transportation Company.

Service history
In 1875 Beaver passed into the ownership of the Willamette Falls Locks and Canal Company.  Beaver worked on the Willamette River and then on the Columbia River on the run from Portland, Oregon to Astoria, Oregon.

In June 1876 Beaver was sold to Uriah Nelson and taken north to the Stikine River to serve traffic generated by the Cassiar Gold Rush.

The boat was wrecked but her machinery was salvaged.

Notes

Willamette Transportation Company
Steamboats of Oregon
Steamboats of British Columbia
Steamboats of the Columbia River
Steamboats of the Willamette River
Steamboats of the Stikine River